Wild's Triplet is a group of three small, interacting spiral galaxies. The galaxies are visible in the constellation Virgo. The triplet has luminous connecting bridges and is located some 200 million light-years away. The aforementioned bridges are probably formed as a result of gravitational tidal interactions among the galaxies. The triplet is named after the British-born and Australia-based astronomer Paul Wild (1923–2008), who studied the trio in the early 1950s.

See also
 Zwicky's Triplet
 Robert's Quartet
 Stephan's Quintet
 NGC 7331 Group (also known as the Deer Lick Group, about half a degree northeast of Stephan's Quintet)
 Seyfert's Sextet
 Copeland Septet

References

Virgo (constellation)